Branbury State Park is a 69-acre state park in the towns of Salisbury and Leicester, Vermont. The park is located on the eastern shore of Lake Dunmore at the base of Mt. Moosalamoo. It is divided by Vermont Route 53.

Activities includes boating, swimming, camping, fishing, hiking, picnicking, wildlife watching and winter sports.

Facilities include a sandy beach, boat rentals, a snack concession, 37 tent sites and 7 lean-to sites, flush toilets, hot showers, and a dump station. There is a nature center and park rangers offer interpretive programs including night hikes, campfire programs, amphibian explorations, and nature crafts and games.

Green Mountain National Forest is adjacent to the park's east side.

References

External links
Official website

State parks of Vermont
Protected areas of Addison County, Vermont
Leicester, Vermont
Salisbury, Vermont
Nature centers in Vermont
1945 establishments in Vermont
Protected areas established in 1945